Cuthbert Crick (24 October 1920 – 1991) was a Barbadian cricketer. He played in two first-class matches for the Barbados cricket team in 1940/41.

See also
 List of Barbadian representative cricketers

References

External links
 

1920 births
1991 deaths
Barbadian cricketers
Barbados cricketers